The Williston Historic District in Williston, Tennessee is a historic district which was listed on the National Register of Historic Places in 1995.

The  listed area included 42 contributing buildings and a contributing site.

The district includes:
Crawford General Store, separately listed on the National Register
Crawford's Experiment Farm, separately listed on the National Register
Hugh F. Crawford House (c.1840-50), 290 Hotel Street, built as a one-story, three-bay, cottage with Greek Revival influence, modified to two-stories with Craftsman influence in c.1910-15.

References

National Register of Historic Places in Fayette County, Tennessee
Historic districts on the National Register of Historic Places in Tennessee
Greek Revival architecture in Tennessee
Italianate architecture in Tennessee
Colonial Revival architecture in Tennessee
Fayette County, Tennessee